is a Japanese manga by Rumiko Takahashi published in February 1983 issue of Shōnen Sunday Zōkan. The manga was later compiled in Rumic World books, which are available in English from Viz Media. It was adapted into an anime OVA released in 1987. A subtitled VHS release was published in North America by US Manga Corps on April 7, 1993. An English dub was produced by Manga UK.

Plot
The main character of the series is Yuzuru Shiga, one of the descendants of the expiring Shiga clan along with his cousin Azusa Shiga, the daughter of his father's older sister. In order to preserve the family legacy, Azusa's mother and Yuzuru's father agree to have cousins Azusa and Yuzuru marry each other when they are of age. Ten years later, Azusa's mother dies and Azusa goes to live with Yuzuru's family. Azusa fully intends on claiming that promise of marriage from Yuzuru in spite of it being wrought during their childhood. She has been waiting, faithful, not so as much speaking to another boy since that time. Yuzuru, however, has his own life as a high school student: He's the captain of the archery club, and he has a girlfriend named Satomi.

Even though Yuzuru has paid no heed to the betrothal, Azusa has taken it very seriously and expects Yuzuru to fulfill their family expectations. When he was a child, Yuzuru also promised her directly that he’d stay with her, and she took it to heart. When Azusa sees Yuzuru with Satomi, she tries to scare Satomi off in the hope that Yuzuru will return to her; but instead, he goes back to Satomi. Azusa then decides she has to take care of Satomi permanently. And that’s no idle threat because, unknown to Yuzuru, Azusa is a demon because of a family curse, which first manifested itself after Azusa killed a group of boys who tried to rape her.

Satomi tries to tell Yuzuru that Azusa is after her, but she can’t do it directly because Azusa is stalking her. Worse yet, Yuzuru, while aware that something strange is going on, is somewhat oblivious to Azusa’s actions.

Reception
On Anime News Network, Justin Sevakis said the anime "isn't perfect, but it's thoroughly engrossing".

References

External links
 
 Furinkan.com page on Laughing Target

1983 manga
1987 anime OVAs
Central Park Media
Horror anime and manga
One-shot manga
Rumic World
Shogakukan manga
Shōnen manga
Viz Media manga
Works by Rumiko Takahashi